FC Stade Nyonnais is an association football club based in the town of Nyon, Switzerland. The team currently competes in the Promotion League, the third tier of the Swiss football league system and plays its home matches at Stade de Colovray, where it has been since 1991. Founded in 1905, it is nicknamed the "jaune et noir" (which translates to "yellow and black") and affiliated to the Vaud Cantonal Football Association.

History

FC Stade Nyonnais was founded in 1905 by then-teenagers Oscar Aeby, Edmond Delay, Emile Aeby and Pierre Robin as Bluet. Football was rapidly popularising in Nyon and Switzerland at the start of the 20th Century and the club was one of many emerging football teams in the town along with FC Nyon (who were the first club in Nyon), Fortuna Nyon, Nyon-Sport, Nyon FC, and Rive. They initially played their home games at a courtyard of a local Catholic church in Nyon. The pitch dimensions, however, did not meet requirements and they therefore relocated to Place Perdtemps (now converted into a car park) in 1906. Their stay there ended swiftly as the local authorities took issue with allowing a group of boys (their oldest player was 18 at the time) playing football in a public space. The club played their first 4 seasons in the Coup de Léman; a competition created by FC Nyon in which all clubs in Romandy competed in. After undergoing several name changes, the club had eventually settled on FC Stade Nyonnais by 1907. 2 years later, Stade Nyonnais were admitted to the Association Cantonale Vaudoise de Football; the regional football association of the Vaud canton in which Nyon is located. The club competed in the second tier of the competition and proceeded to win their first title when they were crowned champions of the division in 1910. Les Nyonnais, as they are often referred as, joined the Swiss Football Association in 1918 following the end of World War I.

By 1924, the club moved away from Place Perdtemps and began to play their matches at a newly built ground in Marens, Nyon (the land is now in use by local secondary school Ecole Secondaire de Nyon-Marens). In 1925, the team earned promotion to the second tier of Swiss football after being crowned regional champions of Romandy (French-speaking region of Switzerland) and would proceed to remain in the league for the subsequent six years. The same year, they competed in the inaugural Swiss Cup tournament in which they reached the round of 16. In 1926, Jean Wirz, who was elected Stade Nyonnais president the following decade, formed a youth academy for the club.

By 1946, Stade Nyonnais gained promotion back to the third tier of Swiss football (Première Ligue) in which they survived for the subsequent four years. Relegation from the Première Ligue saw them compete in the fourth tier of Swiss football and the fans awaited 17 years to see their team back in the Première Ligue.

1991 marked the opening year of the club's current stadium Stade Colovray.

In 2001 the club had a big game against Real Madrid, in which they reached a record attendance of 6,800 spectators. High-profile players such as Zinedine Zidane participated in the match.

The club enjoyed their best ever Swiss Cup run in 2007 when they managed to reach the quarter finals. The tournament came to an end for Les Nyonnais in a 2–0 defeat to top-tier side FC Basel.

Nyon had survived several seasons in the second tier of Swiss football, the Challenge League, until the 2011–12 season. Due to restructuring of the Swiss Football League, it was announced that the bottom 6 teams of the 10 team division would be relegated to a newly formed division in 2012, rather than the usual two teams being relegated. Nyon was close to survival but finished two points from safety, and were relegated to the Promotion League. They have remained in the league ever since.

Club colours

FC Stade Nyonnais' colours have been black and yellow ever since the club's foundation in 1905. It is established historically through archival documents that said colours were adopted by the founders as a tribute to BSC Young Boys who were crowned Swiss champions in 1903. The yellow and black also distinguished them from the colours of FC Nyon United (now defunct) who played their matches in the same city.

Misconceptions surrounding Jean Wirz
Bern-born Jean Wirz is often credited as the founder of Stade Nyonnais and the reason behind their yellow and black colour. This claim, however, is not supported by historical evidence. Wirz, who was involved in Nyon sports circles for almost half a century, only settled in Nyon in April 1920. He formed the youth section of the club in 1926 before taking up the role of vice-president in 1930. After a 5-year vice-presidency, he operated as club president from 1935–37.

Stadium

Current squad
Updated 26 September 2022.

Backroom staff and club committee members

First team staff

Central committee

Former players

List of presidents

List of head coaches
Below is a list of current and former Stade Nyonnais head coaches since 1965.

Footnotes
 From 1946 to 2003, 'Ligue National A' referred to the top tier of Swiss football, 'Ligue National B' referred to the second tier of Swiss football, and 'Première Ligue' referred to the third tier of Swiss football.

References

External links
Official Website  

 
Football clubs in Switzerland
Association football clubs established in 1905
Nyon
1905 establishments in Switzerland